The 2007 South Sydney Rabbitohs season was the 98th in the club's history. They competed in National Rugby League season 2007 under the new ownership of Russell Crowe and Peter Holmes à Court and with a new coach in Jason Taylor. The club finished the regular season 7th (out of 16) and were knocked out of the play-offs by eventual grand-finalists Manly-Warringah.

Season summary
The Rabbitohs' 2007 season was detailed in the documentary South Side Story.

After three rounds South Sydney had three wins, matching their total win tally of the previous season. The Bulldogs brought them back to earth in round 4. The Rabbitohs' co-captain, Kiwi international forward David Kidwell, then fell in a freak accident at a family barbecue and injured his knee. He would require knee re-construction surgery and was not expected to return for the rest of the season.

Souths signed Craig Wing mid-season. The Souths junior would play out the rest of 2007 with the Sydney Roosters before returning to the Rabbitohs for 2008.

For the first time in 18 years the South Sydney Rabbitohs made it to the finals series, finishing in 7th position.

Roy Asotasi won the George Piggins Medal as the club's player of the year.

Results

Ladder

Players

Player movements
Gains

Losses

Re-Signings

Kit and Sponsors

National Australia Bank
The National Australia Bank was the Rabbitohs major home sponsor for the 2007 Telstra Premiership.

DeLonghi
DeLonghi was the major away sponsor for the Rabbitohs in the 2007 Telstra Premiership.

V8 Supercars Australia
V8 Supercars was the Rabbitohs major sleeve sponsor for the 2007 Telstra Premiership.

Virgin Blue
Virgin Blue was the Rabbitohs major training sponsor for the 2007 Telstra Premiership.

Player statistics

Representative Honours

References

South Sydney Rabbitohs seasons
South Sydney Rabbitohs season